Vehicle registration plates of Botswana for normal motor vehicles begin with the letter B, followed by three digits, followed by three letters. The digits and letters are assigned by a registrar. The three letters will never include the letter Q so as to avoid confusion with the letter O. The front number plates have black lettering on a white  reflective background. The rear number plates have black lettering on a yellow reflective background. Public passenger number plates have blue lettering on a white reflective background in the front and white lettering on blue background at the rear.

Government vehicles all have the prefix BX, except defence force vehicles which have the prefix BDF. The front BX number plates have red lettering on a white reflective background. The rear BX number plates have white lettering on a red reflective background. The BDF number plates have white letters on a green non-reflective background for the front plate and black letters on a green non-reflective background for the rear plate.

Diplomatic vehicles’ number plates starts with two digits, two letters (CD, CC or CT) and a further three digits. These digits are allocated by the Minister of Foreign Affairs.

Republic of Botswana and Bechuanaland Protectorate 
These codes dating back to the Protectorate continued in use after independence:
BPA – Francistown
BPB – Serowe
BPC – Tuli Block
BPD – Gaborone
BPE – Molepolole
BPF – Lobatse
BPG – Kanye
BPH – Tshabong
BPI – Ghanzi
BPJ – Maun
BPK – Kasane
BPL – Mochudi
Government:
BPX – Government vehicles

References

2. Holcroft’s South African Calendar 1975, published by Vergne, Pretoria (for earlier codes).

External links

Botswana
Transport in Botswana
Botswana transport-related lists